The Sacrifice of Polyxena is a 17th-century painting by Italian artist Giovanni Francesco Romanelli. Done in oil on canvas, the painting depicts the death of Polyxena, a captive Trojan princess sacrificed to appease the ghost of the Greek hero Achilles, whom had been killed by the Trojans. The painting is currently in the collection of the Metropolitan Museum of Art.

See also
The Sacrifice of Polyxena (Charles Le Brun) - a contemporary painting of the same title and concerning the same subject.

References

Paintings in the collection of the Metropolitan Museum of Art
17th-century paintings
Italian paintings